CAS International is an international non-profit advocacy group which aims to end bullfighting. CAS International was founded in 1993 as Comité Anti Stierenvechten, with the help of ADDA from Barcelona, Spain, De Dierenbescherming (Dutch Society for the Protection of Animals) and the international animal welfare organisation WSPA originally aimed at stopping Dutch tourists from going to bullfighting.

In 2008 the name Comité Anti Stierenvechten was changed to CAS International because its original goal had been achieved: the majority of Dutch tourists don't visit bullfights and Dutch travel organisations do not promote bullfighting any more. The name change reflects the current scope of activities that have gradually changed to international campaigning in close cooperation with anti-bullfighting organisations in Europe and Latin America.

It is the largest organisation exclusively dedicated to the abolition of bullfighting everywhere in the world, and according to their website, they have 14,000 members. CAS International has its head office in the Netherlands, and has a branch office in Belgium.

See also 
 Anti-Bullfighting City
 Animal ethics
 Animal rights
 Animal welfare
 Cruelty to animals
 List of animal rights groups

References

External links 
 CAS International website
 Bullfightingfree Europe

Animal welfare organisations based in the Netherlands
Bullfighting
Organisations based in Utrecht (city)
Organizations established in 1993
1993 establishments in the Netherlands
Criticisms of bullfighting